Naan Yen Pirandhen is a 1972 Indian Tamil-language film directed by M. Krishnan. The film stars M. G. Ramachandran, K. R. Vijaya and Kanchana. It is a remake of the 1953 Telugu film Bratuku Teruvu. The film was released on 9 June 1972 and failed commercially.

Plot 
Kannan and Saradha are married. He helps bring up his brother's children. Kannan obtains employment hiding his marriage with Mohanasundaram only for his daughter, paraplegic Radha, to fall in love with him. How he deftly handles the situation without losing his job or affecting the faint-hearted Radha without losing his integrity forms the main story. 

He then manages to resolve all issues and expose his marriage in such a manner that everyone is safe as is his job.

Cast 
 M. G. Ramachandran as Kannan
 K. R. Vijaya as Saradha
 Kanchana as Radha
 Nagesh as Sabhabadhi
 Sundarrajan as Mohan Sundaram
 Thengai Srinivasan as Bhaskar
 M. N. Nambiar as Rajan
 V. Gopalakrishnan as Shankar
 G. Sakunthala as Mohana
 S. N. Lakshmi as Chinnamma

Production 
Naan Yen Pirandhen is a remake of the 1953 Telugu film Bratuku Teruvu. It was the only film to feature Ramachandran in a family-oriented role. The dialogues were written by Vietnam Veedu Sundaram. Kamal Haasan worked as an assistant dance choreographer under K. Thangappan.

Soundtrack 
The music was composed by Shankar–Ganesh. They said they chose to do the film simply because Ramachandran was in it.

Release 
Naan Yen Pirandhen was released on 9 June 1972. Randor Guy wrote in The Hindu that the film, in contrast to Bratuku Teruvu, underperformed commercially as it ran only for 10 weeks in theatres.

References

External links 
 

1970s Tamil-language films
1972 films
Films directed by M. Krishnan Nair
Films scored by Shankar–Ganesh
Tamil remakes of Telugu films